Jason Carroll (born November 12, 1985), known professionally as Skinny Hightower, is an American jazz pianist. In 2020, his album Blue Moon finished as the 14th overall smooth jazz album on the Smooth Jazz Year End Top 100 Album Chart. In the same year, his single "Bittersweet" finished as the sixth overall single on the 2020 Billboard Year-End charts for Smooth Jazz Airplay Songs. Two singles from Blue Moon, the title track "Blue Moon" and "Now or Never", finished 36th and 38th respectively on the 2021 Billboard Year-End charts for Smooth Jazz Airplay Songs. Hightower was also the number seven artist on the 2021 Billboard Year-End Smooth Jazz Airplay Artists list. Hightower's singles "Blue Moon," "Now or Never," and "Taboo" all reached number one on the Smooth Jazz Airplay Billboard charts.
 "Blue Moon" also reached number one on the Smooth Jazz Network Top 20 singles chart.

Early life
Hightower was born as in Wichita, Kansas on November 12, 1985. Hightower's interest in music began at age two when he would sit on his father's lap and play the drums. His involvement would continue as he later developed a mild interest in piano at age eight and began playing bass at the age of 12. Jazz and gospel were his primary musical influences at the time. Hightower later attended Wichita South High School where he played as a percussionist in the marching band, pep band, jazz band, and concert band.

Music career

2012-2017: Military service and Cloud Nine
In 2012, Skinny Hightower enlisted in the United States Army where he served for five years and became a sergeant. He deployed to Afghanistan during the War in Afghanistan for a few months. Four years into his military contract, he recorded and released his first studio album Cloud Nine.

Name origin
Hightower's pseudonym originated as a nickname given to him by his fellow servicemembers. Upon learning that he was a jazz musician, his Army friends called him a skinny Mr. Hightower (played by Steve Harvey) in connection with the 1996 sitcom The Steve Harvey Show.

2020: Blue Moon 
In 2020, Skinny Hightower released Blue Moon which spawned the second and third number one Billboard singles of his career. The production of the album consisted of the recording of 100 songs of which 24 were selected by a team of 10 individuals.

Discography

Studio albums

Singles

Collaborations

Live performances

Festivals

See also

Music 
 Billboard charts
 Jazz piano
 Smooth jazz
 Smooth jazz radio

Lists
 List of jazz pianists
 List of people from Wichita, Kansas
 List of smooth jazz musicians
 Lists of African Americans

Other
 United States Army
 U.S. Army Sergeant

References

External links
Official Website
Skinny Hightower at AllMusic
Skinny Hightower on Spotify

1985 births
Living people
21st-century American male musicians
21st-century African-American musicians
African-American jazz pianists
African-American songwriters
American male jazz musicians
American male pianists
American male songwriters
American multi-instrumentalists
Musicians from Kansas
People from Wichita, Kansas
Smooth jazz pianists
United States Army non-commissioned officers
United States Army personnel of the War in Afghanistan (2001–2021)